Eric Thornton Turkington (born August 12, 1947) is an American lawyer and politician. He is a former Democratic member of the Massachusetts House of Representatives, who represented the Barnstable, Dukes and Nantucket District from 1989-2009.

Career 

On November 7, 2006, he won his race against Republican Jim Powell in the 2006 elections. He did not run for reelection in 2008, instead running for Barnstable Register of Probate. He served as a co-chair of the Rachel Carson sculpture committee.

Personal life 
He is married to his wife Nancy and they have two children. They live in Falmouth, Massachusetts.

References

External links
Massachusetts House of Representatives profile

1947 births
Living people
People from Gouverneur, New York
People from Falmouth, Massachusetts
University of Pennsylvania alumni
Boston College Law School alumni
Massachusetts lawyers
Democratic Party members of the Massachusetts House of Representatives